The culmen is the portion of the anterior vermis adjacent to the primary fissure of cerebellum.

The culmen and the anterior parts of the quadrangular lobules form the lobus culminis.

Additional Images

References

External links
 https://web.archive.org/web/20010514005529/http://www.ib.amwaw.edu.pl/anatomy/atlas/image_11e.htm
 https://web.archive.org/web/20080614064333/http://www.ib.amwaw.edu.pl/anatomy/atlas/image_06e.htm
 NIF Search - Culmen via the Neuroscience Information Framework

Cerebellum